June 2017

See also

References 

 06
June 2017 events in the United States